Khalid bin Abdul Samad (Jawi: خالد بن عبدالصمد; born 14 August 1957) is a Malaysian politician who served as the Minister of Federal Territories in the Pakatan Harapan (PH) administration under former Prime Minister Mahathir Mohamad from July 2018 to the collapse of the PH administration in February 2020 and the Member of Parliament (MP) for Shah Alam from March 2008 to November 2022. He is a member, Communications Director and State Chairman of Kelantan of the National Trust Party (AMANAH), a component party of the PH opposition coalition and was a member of the Malaysian Islamic Party (PAS), a former component party of the former Pakatan Rakyat (PR) and Barisan Alternatif (BA) opposition coalitions. He is the younger brother of Shahrir Abdul Samad, former Minister and MP of the United Malays National Organisation (UMNO), a component party of the Barisan Nasional (BN) coalition. Before PH and BN formed the federal coalition government in November 2022, they were opposing politically as both of them were in opposing political sides.

Early life
Khalid was born in Kota Bharu, Kelantan in 1957.

He graduated with a degree in Fuel and Energy Engineering from Leeds University in 1979 and then worked for Petronas.

Political career
He was a columnist at The Malaysian Insider and a prominent member of the moderate wing of PAS before they split to found AMANAH in 2015.

Khalid joined PAS in 1983 and became a central committee member from 1987 to 1993. 
In 1987, he was detained for nine months under the Internal Security Act (ISA) during Operation Lalang crackdown.

He had unsuccessfully contested as PAS candidate the parliamentary seats of Kuala Krai (1986), Arau (1990), Sri Gading (1999) and Shah Alam (2004) in the general elections before finally won the Shah Alam seat in the 2008 general election and retained it in the 2013 general election.

In 2010, Khalid became engaged in a debate with fellow opposition (later pro-government independent) Member of Parliament Zulkifli Nordin over the use of the word "Allah" by non-Muslims. After Khalid stated that he opposed a Selangor law that prohibited non-Muslims from using the word "Allah", Zulkifli lodged a police report accusing Khalid of sedition. Zulkifi, a Kedah MP, moved to Selangor to run in the Shah Alam seat against Khalid in the 2013 election as a Barisan Nasional (BN) candidate, but was beaten by Khalid who was re-elected with an increased margin.

In August 2014, Khalid was charged under Section 4 of the Sedition Act for allegedly questioning the executive powers of the Selangor Islamic Religious Department (Jais) in relation to the confiscation of Malay-language and Iban-language bibles. Khalid was among several other opposition politicians as well as non-politicians arrested in the 2014 Malaysian sedition dragnet.

Khalid again managed to retain the Shah Alam seat in the 2018 general election but the first time for the Amanah party and was soon selected as the new PH coalition federal government cabinet minister.

On 23 October 2022, AMANAH election director Asmuni Awi revealed that Khalid would contest for the Titiwangsa federal seat in the 2022 general election. Asmuni also commented that AMANAH was taking risk to field Khalid to contest for the seat instead of the Shah Alam federal seat which is the stronghold of Khalid. Khalid also added that it was not an easy decision to leave Shah Alam where he had served as MP from 2008 to 2022 for three terms and 14 years.He lost the election to Johari Abdul Ghani from BN and UMNO by a minority of 4,632 votes by garnering 20,410 votes. His defeat also paved the way for Johari to return as Titiwangsa MP and is the only electoral defeat of PH in Kuala Lumpur.

Election results

Controversies 

 The gazettement of the Kuala Lumpur City Plan (KLCP) 2020 by Federal Territories Minister YB Khalid Abdul Samad late last October, was met with dismay by many stakeholders. The gazetted plan was neither the 2008 draft local plan nor the 2013 revised plan, but a “2015” version that had not gone through the processes and procedures required, as stipulated under the Federal Territory Planning Act.
 The use of the Land Acquisition Act upon Kampung Baru residents. A provision of RM10 billion was made to buy Kampung Baru land, without the Cabinet’s prior approval. It is believed that he could have protected the people's interest in the Sungai Baru flats case and not allowing the residents to sign a lopsided agreement with the developer during his time as the Federal Territories minister. Similarly in 2017, developers had approached his predecessor to get the residents' signatures, but it was declined due to questionable track records.
 Khalid filed a suit against Mahamad Naser in December 2017 claiming that he (Mahamad Naser) made malicious statements against him in a seminar organised by the Selangor Islamic Religious Department (JAIS) on Sept 28, 2017 at the Tengku Ampuan Jemaah Mosque, Bukit Jelutong in Shah Alam. Khalid claimed that Mahamad Naser, had in a lecture entitled, `Discourse on current issues and Selangor state legislation: Doctrine: Challenges and Constitution,’ had among other matters, stated that he (Khalid) was strongly against RUU355, against the implementation of Islamic law including hudud, and opposed efforts to empower the Syariah Courts. The High Court on July 17, 2019, ruled in favour of Khalid and ordered Mahamad Naser to pay him RM80,000. A Federal Court three-member panel comprising Justices Tan Sri Rohana Yusuf and Federal Court judges Datuk Harmindar Singh Dhaliwal and Datuk Mohamad Zabidin Mohd Diah, in an online court proceeding today, dismissed Khalid’s application and ordered him to pay RM30,000 costs.

References

External links
 

1957 births
Living people
People from Kota Bharu
People from Kelantan
Malaysian people of Malay descent
Malaysian Muslims
Malaysian bloggers
Malaysian engineers
National Trust Party (Malaysia) politicians
Former Malaysian Islamic Party politicians
Members of the Dewan Rakyat
Government ministers of Malaysia
Alumni of the University of Leeds
21st-century Malaysian politicians